Frank Scrine  (9 January 1925 – 5 October 2001) was a Welsh international footballer forward. He was part of the Wales national football team between 1949 and 1950, playing 2 matches. He played his first match on 15 October 1949 against England and his last match on 8 March 1950 against Ireland. At club level, he played for Swansea Town between 1947 and 1954, playing 142 matches, scoring 45 goals. He moved to Oldham Athletic and was the topscorer for the team in the 1953–54 season with 9 goals.

After leaving the English football league he played in the Welsh Football League with Llanelli, Ammanford, Milford United, Haverfordwest County and Bettws. He was a foreman at AWCO in Swansea, then a caretaker in the St David's Centre in Swansea and died on 5 October 2001.

See also
 List of Wales international footballers (alphabetical)

References

1925 births
2001 deaths
Welsh footballers
Wales international footballers
Swansea City A.F.C. players
Oldham Athletic A.F.C. players
Place of birth missing
Association football forwards
Llanelli Town A.F.C. players
Haverfordwest County A.F.C. players
Milford United F.C. players